The 2022 LendingTree Bowl was a college football bowl game played on December 17, 2022, at Hancock Whitney Stadium in Mobile, Alabama. The 24th annual LendingTree Bowl, the game featured Southern Miss from the Sun Belt Conference and Rice from Conference USA (C-USA). The game began at 4:50 p.m. CST and aired on ESPN. It was one of the 2022–23 bowl games concluding the 2022 FBS football season. The game's title sponsor was online lending marketplace LendingTree.

Teams
Based on conference tie-ins, the game usually features teams from the Mid-American Conference and the Sun Belt Conference; however, the matchup for this edition features a team from Conference USA. This will be the thirteenth meeting between Rice and Southern Miss, with the all-time series currently tied at six wins each. From 2005 to 2021, the Owls and Golden Eagles played together as members of Conference USA.

This will be the Owls' first LendingTree Bowl, as well as their first bowl game appearance since the 2014 Hawaii Bowl, where they defeated Fresno State by a score of 30–6. The Golden Eagles will make their third appearance in the LendingTree Bowl, though their first under its current name; they defeated TCU in the 2000 Mobile Alabama Bowl and beat Ohio in the 2007 GMAC Bowl. Their last bowl game appearance came in 2019, when they played Tulane in the Armed Forces Bowl.

Rice

The Rice Owls, representing Conference USA (C–USA), began Mike Bloomgren's fifth year as head coach with a road trip to Los Angeles and a game at No. 14 USC, which resulted in a 52-point loss. They defeated FCS McNeese State by 42 points in their home opener and followed that up with an 11-point defeat of Louisiana the next weekend. They were defeated by crosstown rivals Houston by a touchdown to conclude their non-conference schedule, and began C–USA play on October 1 with a home victory against UAB. The Owls' first conference loss came following a bye week, as they traveled to play Florida Atlantic and fell by three points. A one-point overtime win over Louisiana Tech and a poor showing against Charlotte, resulting in a 33-point loss, took Rice into November with a 4–4 record. After beating UTEP at home by virtue of a late-game touchdown, the Owls traveled to face Western Kentucky, to whom they lost by five touchdowns. Rice suffered a similar result in their final home game, against UTSA, which they lost by 41 points. Their last regular-season game played out to a four-point defeat to North Texas, a game that sent the Mean Green to the conference championship game.

Rice finished their regular season with an overall record of 5–7 and a 3–5 mark in conference play. Under normal circumstances, this means that Rice would not be eligible for a bowl; however, due to an insufficient number of standard bowl-eligible teams, Academic Progress Rate (APR) is used as a tiebreaker. Rice, having the highest APR among 5–7 teams, became bowl eligible and accepted their bid to the LendingTree Bowl on December 4. In addition, this will be Rice's final game as a member of C–USA, as the Owls are set to join the American Athletic Conference in 2023.

Southern Miss

The Southern Miss Golden Eagles, previously members of Conference USA, represented the Sun Belt Conference for the first time effective July 1, 2022. Their second season under head coach Will Hall began with a home game against Liberty, which went to four overtimes before the Flames earned a two-point victory. A second loss followed as the Golden Eagles were bested by No. 15 Miami (FL), 30–7. They earned their first win of the season with a dominant showing against FCS Northwestern State, and defeated Tulane on the road with the help of a fourth quarter pick-six the next week. After a bye week, Southern Miss traveled to Troy, losing by 17 points, before returning for homecoming and beating Arkansas State by one point. This was the start of a three-game winning streak that went through the end of October and included further victories over Texas State, by six points, and Louisiana, by fifteen. November started much worse for the Golden Eagles, however, as they dropped a home game to Georgia State before a road trip to Coastal Carolina ended in a three-point loss. Southern Miss's losing skid extended to three games as they faltered in their home finale against South Alabama. Needing a win in their final game against Louisiana–Monroe to achieve bowl eligibility, the Golden Eagles defeated the Warhawks by ten points to finish the regular season with an overall record of 6–6 and a Sun Belt record of 4–4.

Game summary
The game's officiating crew, representing the Mid-American Conference, was led by referee David Siegle and umpire Ryan McClellan.

Statistics

References

LendingTree Bowl
LendingTree Bowl
LendingTree Bowl
LendingTree Bowl
Rice Owls football bowl games
Southern Miss Golden Eagles football bowl games